Boris Keca (born 5 April 1978) is a Bosnian-Herzegovinian former footballer who spent several seasons at Romanian football clubs, playing as a midfielder.

Club career 
Keca was born in Bihać, Yugoslavia. He started playing in Romania with Naţional Bucharest, a club at the time popular for foreign players from Eastern-Europe (the likes of his fellow Bosnian Slaviša Mitrović or Albanian Albert Duro) or Australians (Michael Thwaite, Ryan Griffiths or Jonathan McKain). With Naţional he could compete in the 2002–03 UEFA Cup, where they would edge out teams like Tirana and Heerenveen before eventually being eliminated by Paris Saint-Germain in the Second Round.

He made his debut in Liga I on 19 November 1999 against Universitatea Craiova.

He then transferred in 2003 to Braşov, from where he was brought to Steaua Bucharest in January 2005, by his former Naţional coach Walter Zenga, ahead of their 2004–05 UEFA Cup matches, where they managed to reach the Round of 16 after surpassing Valencia. He was being dropped out of the team after the defeat in the 2005 Romanian Supercup match.

Subsequently, he spent the 2004–2005 season at Pandurii Târgu Jiu, where they succeeded finishing in the last non-relegating spot in a season after which the first league would change from 16 to 18 teams. The following season, he was brought to Argeş Piteşti by another Italian manager Giuseppe Giannini. The club would get relegated at the end of the season finishing 17th, with Giannini being sacked after nine consecutive defeats.

Towards the end of his playing career he signed with the second league side Concordia Chiajna and the following season with the fourth division team of outer Bucharest, Voinţa Domneşti.

Honours 
Runner-Up:

 Naţional București
 Romanian Cup: 2002–03
 Steaua București
 Romanian Supercup: 2005

References 

1978 births
Living people
People from Bihać
Association football midfielders
Bosnia and Herzegovina footballers
FC Progresul București players
FC Brașov (1936) players
FC Steaua București players
CS Pandurii Târgu Jiu players
FC Argeș Pitești players
CS Concordia Chiajna players
Liga I players
Liga II players
Bosnia and Herzegovina expatriate footballers
Expatriate footballers in Romania
Bosnia and Herzegovina expatriate sportspeople in Romania
Serbs of Bosnia and Herzegovina